Lake Colorado City is an unincorporated community and census-designated place in Mitchell County, Texas, United States. Its population was 588 as of the 2010 census.

Geography

References

Census-designated places in Mitchell County, Texas
Census-designated places in Texas
Unincorporated communities in Mitchell County, Texas
Unincorporated communities in Texas